The following is a timeline of the history of the city of Aleppo, Syria.

Prior to 10th century

 Founded before 2000 BCE
 1800–1525 BCE – part of the Amorite dynasty
 333 BCE – Alexander the Great in power.
 286 BCE – Hellenic settlement of Beroea established.
 88 BCE – City becomes part of Kingdom of Armenia.
 64 BCE – City becomes part of Roman Syria.
 611 CE – Persian Chosroes II in power.
 637
 July–October: Siege of Aleppo by Muslim forces.
 Al-Shuaibiyah Mosque built.
 717 – Great Mosque built.

10th–12th centuries

 944 – Sayf al-Dawla in power.
 962 – City sacked by the Byzantines.
 1086 - Aleppo submit to the rule of Malik-Shah, the Turkish ruler of the Seljuk Empire
 1090 – Seljuks in power.
 1124 – City besieged by Christian crusaders under Baldwin II of Jerusalem.
 1124 – Al-Halawiyah Madrasa built.
 1138 – 11 October: Earthquake was one of  deadliest of all time.
 1168 – Al-Muqaddamiyah Madrasa established.
 1170 – 29 June: Earthquake.
 1183 – Saladin assumes power.
 1193
 Az-Zahir Ghazi in power.
 Al-Shadbakhtiyah Madrasa built.

13th century
 1211 – Hammam al-Sultan built.
 1212 – Bab al-Nasr (gate) rebuilt.
 1218 – Aqueduct restored.
 1223 – Al-Sultaniyah Madrasa established.
 1230 – Bab al-Maqam (gate) built.
 1236 – Al-Firdaws Madrasa established.
 1237
 Khanqah al-Farafira (monastery) and Al-Kameliyah Madrasa built.
 Bab al-Nairab (gate) built (approximate date).
 1242 – Al-Sharafiyah Madrasa built.
 1251 – Al-Turantaiyah Madrasa built.
 1256 – Bab Qinnasrin (gate) rebuilt.
 1260 – City besieged by Mongol forces under Hulagu Khan.
 1280 – City besieged by Mongol forces.

14th–15th centuries

 1303 – Mahmandar Mosque built.
 1318 – Altun Bogha Mosque built.
 1350 – Al-Sahibiyah Mosque built.
 1354 – Bimaristan Arghun al-Kamili (asylum) active.
 1398 – Al-Otrush Mosque and Al-Tawashi mosque built.
 1400 – City sacked by forces of Timur of Transoxia.
 1427 – Citadel expanded.
 1418 – Central Synagogue rebuilt.
 1425 – Al-Saffahiyah Mosque built.
 1429 – Forty Martyrs Cathedral consecrated.
 1450
 Khan al-Qadi active in Al-Madina Souq.
 Hammam al-Bayadah built.
 1472 – Khan al-Burghul built in Al-Madina Souq.
 1491 – Hammam Yalbugha built.
 1500
 Cathedral of Our Lady of Syrians built.
 Church of the Dormition of Our Lady renovated.

16th century
 1509 – Bab al-Hadid (gate) rebuilt.
 1516 – Ottoman Selim I in power.
 1517 – Becomes part of Ottoman Empire.
 1534 – City becomes capital of Aleppo Eyalet.
 1537 – Population: 80,000.
 1539 – Souq Khan al-Nahhaseen built in Al-Madina Souq.
 1546 – Khan al-Shouneh built in Al-Madina Souq.
 1547 – Khusruwiyah Mosque built.
 1548 – Consulate of Republic of Venice established.
 1557 – Al-Adiliyah Mosque built (approximate date).
 1562 – Consulate of France established.
 1583 – Consulate of England established.

17th–18th centuries

 1603 – Beit Wakil (mansion) built.
 1622 – Levant Company in business.
 1613 – Consulate of the Netherlands established.
 1629 – Guild of "makers of swords, knives, daggers, bows, and shields" organized.
 1682 - Souq Khan al-Wazir built in Al-Madina Souq.
 1683 - Population: 115,000.
 1706 - Printing press established.
 1724 – Al-Ahmadiyah Madrasa established.
 1730 – Madrasa Ridaiya established.

19th century
 1805 – Uprising.
 1812 – Earthquake; citadel collapses.
 1814 – "Janissary massacre."
 1822 – Earthquake.
 1823
 Cholera outbreak.
 Population: 250,000 (approximate).
 1827 – Plague.
 1830 – Earthquake.
 1832
 Ibrahim Pasha takes city for Muhammad Ali of Egypt.
 Cholera outbreak.
 1834 – Military barracks built in the Citadel.
 1840 – Mohammed Ali relinquishes power.
 1850
 City besieged by Beduins.
 Massacre of Aleppo (1850).
 1853 – Pogrom of Jews.
 1858 – Population: 70,000 (approximate).
 1859 – Terre-Sainte College opens.
 1864 – City becomes capital of Aleppo Vilayet.
 1868 – Municipal council formed.
 1873 – Saint Elias Cathedral built.
 1875 – Pogrom of Jews.
 1878 – Population: 95,000 (approximate).
 1885 – Aleppo chamber of commerce founded.
 1892 – Thanawiyyat al-Ma'mun (school) opens.
 1899 - Bab al-Faraj Clock Tower built.

20th century

 1901 – Ades Synagogue established.
 1906 – Hama-Aleppo railway in operation.
 1909 – Abd al-Wahab al-Inklizi becomes mayor.
 1910
 Nadi al-Ta'ddud (Mutual Aid Society) founded.
 Population: 130,000 (approximate).
 1911 – Baron Hotel in business.
 1912 – Baghdad Railway in operation.
 1916 – Aleppo College established.
 1918 – Ihsan al-Jabiri becomes mayor.
 1920 - Syria mandated to the French; city becomes capital of State of Aleppo.
 1922 - Red Hand Society organized (approximate date).
 1924
 Damascus and Aleppo united by the French.
 Airport in operation (approximate date).
 Municipal library established.
 1925 – Al-Yarmouk Sporting Club formed.
 1927 – al-Hadith journal begins publication.
 1931 - National Museum of Aleppo founded.
 1933 - Grand Serail d'Alep opens.
 1936 - al-Nazir newspaper begins publication.
 1945
 National Library of Aleppo and Club d'Alep open.
 1947 - Pogrom of Jews.
 1948
 People's Party established.
 Al-Baladi Stadium opens.
 1949
 Aleppo Public Park created.
 Al-Ittihad Sports Club and Jalaa FC formed.
 1950
 Population: 362,500.
 al-Nass newspaper begins publication (approximate date).
 1952 – Hurriya Sporting Club formed.
 1958 – University of Aleppo established.
 1963 – Nasserist insurgency.
 1964 – Population: 547,030 (estimate).
 1965 – Chemins de Fer Syriens headquartered in city.
 1970
 Our Lady of Assumption church opens.
 Population: 639,428.
 1971 – Statue of Qustaki al-Himsi erected in Liberty Square.
 1975 – Popular Traditions Museum opens in Beit Achiqbash.
 1977 – International School of Aleppo established.
 1979 – Aleppo Artillery School massacre took place by Muslim Brotherhood.
 1980 – Siege of Aleppo.
 1983 – International Center for Agricultural Research in the Dry Areas seed bank founded.
 1985 – Population: 1,145,117 (estimate).
 1986 – Al-Hamadaniah Stadium opens.
 1990 – Population: 1,216,000.
 1994
 Aleppo Citadel Museum opens.
 Population: 1,542,000 (estimate).
 1997 – Lycée Français d'Alep established.

21st century

 2002 – Private University of Science and Arts established.
 2004 – Population: 2,132,100.
 2006 – City designated an Islamic Capital of Culture.
 2007 – Aleppo International Stadium opens.
 2008
 Sabah Fakhri Institute of music opened.
 Population: 4,450,000 (estimate).
 2012
 10 February: Bombings.
 18 March: Bombing.
 4 May: Protest and crackdown.
 19 July: Battle of Aleppo begins.
 9 September: Bombing near the 7 April Stadium.
 3 October: Bombing in Saadallah Al-Jabiri Square.
 2013
 15 January: Aleppo University bombings.
 19 March: Chemical weapon attack by militants.
 2016
 22 December: Battle of Aleppo ends.
 2020
 16 February: Syrian Armed Forces recapture the entire city of Aleppo.

See also
 History of Aleppo
 Ancient City of Aleppo
 List of churches in Aleppo
 List of mosques in Aleppo
 List of rulers of Aleppo
 Timelines of other cities in Syria: Damascus, Hama, Homs, Latakia

References

Bibliography

Published in 18th–19th century
 
 
 
 
 
 
 
 
  (+ 1898 ed. and 1912 ed.)

Published in 20th century
 
 
 
Ralph Davis, Aleppo and Devonshire Square  English Traders in the Levant in the Eighteenth Century (1967) Macmillan
 
 
 Yasser Tabbaa. "Circles of Power: Palace, Citadel, and City in Ayyubid Aleppo." Ars Orientalis 23 (1993): 181–200.
 

Published in 21st century
 
 
 
 
 
 Nora Lafi, "Building and Destroying Authenticity in Aleppo: Heritage between Conservation, Transformation, Destruction, and Re-Invention" in Christoph Bernhardt, Martin Sabrow, Achim Saupe (eds.)., Gebaute Geschichte. Historische Authentizität im Stadtraum, Göttingen, Wallstein, 2017, pp. 206–228.

External links

  1930s–1940s
 
 Europeana. Items related to Aleppo
 Digital Public Library of America. Items related to Aleppo
  2016–

Aleppo

Years in Syria